Tamás Somorjai (born 12 January 1980) is a Hungarian football player who currently plays for Diósgyőri VTK.

References
HLSZ

1980 births
Living people
Hungarian footballers
Association football midfielders
Ferencvárosi TC footballers
FC Dabas footballers
Celldömölki VSE footballers
FC Sopron players
Rákospalotai EAC footballers
Vasas SC players
Hungarian expatriate footballers
Expatriate footballers in Austria
TSV Hartberg players
Hungarian expatriate sportspeople in Austria
Diósgyőri VTK players
Footballers from Budapest